ILRM may refer to:

 Institut für Logistikrecht & Riskmanagement
 Interim Local Management Interface, telecommunication component
 International League for the Rights of Man
 Irish Law Reports Monthly